Kihalac   is a village in Croatia. It is connected by the D37 highway.

References

External links

Populated places in Sisak-Moslavina County
Glina, Croatia